Modey Lemon is the eponymous debut of American rock band Modey Lemon. It was recorded and released before Jason Kirker joined the band.

Track listing

"Big Bang" - 2:59
"His Face" - 2:48
"Dr. Body Snatcher" - 3:37
"Enfant Terrible Pt. 1" - 3:34
"It's Hard (The Sequal)" - 0:41
"Coffin Talk" - 5:59
"Recycler" - 1:42
"Bad Neighborhood" - 3:52
"Feed The Babies" - 3:24
"Grandpa's Bones" - 2:38
"Enfant Terrible Pt. 2" - 0:51
"Caligula" - 4:53
"Jesus Christ (For Dinner)" - 9:06

Personnel
Phil Boyd - Vocals, guitar and synthesizer
Paul Quattrone - Drums

2002 albums
Modey Lemon albums
A-F Records albums